Mangal Prabhat Lodha (born 1 December 1955) is an Indian businessman and politician. He is the Minister of Ministry of Tourism, Ministry of Skill Development and Entrepreneurship (Maharashtra). He was the president of Bharatiya Janata Party's Mumbai unit. He is the founder of the Macrotech Developers, a Mumbai-based real estate developer. He is also the Member of the Legislative Assembly representing the Malabar Hill constituency of South Mumbai.In 2022, he ranked 37th on the Forbes India rich list with a net-worth of US$5.1 billion.

Early life and education 
Mangal Prabhat Lodha was born and brought up in a Marwari Jain family in Jodhpur. His father Guman Mal Lodha was a freedom fighter and was former chief justice of the Guwahati High Court. He is married to Manju Lodha and has two children. Lodha completed his B.Com and LLB from the University of Jodhpur and practised law in the Jodhpur High Court. Once his father was appointed a judge in the same court, he moved his practice.

In 1981, he moved to Mumbai and laid the foundation of the Lodha Group.

Career in real estate development 
Lodha's firm, Macrotech Developers (erstwhile Lodha Developers), has multiple projects under construction, including the Mumbai luxury high-rise World One. The company invested over $1 billion in developing the township New Cuffe Parade. The company is run by his sons, Abhishek Lodha and Abhinandan. Lodha Developers' shares started trading on NSE (National Stock Exchange) and BSE (Bombay Stock Exchange) on 19 April 2021.

Political career 
Lodha was an active member of the Akhil Bharatiya Vidhyarthi Parishad in his youth.

Lodha has been the MLA of Maharashtra Vidhan Sabha, representing the Malabar Hill constituency for five consecutive terms since 1995, after beating the then incumbent Balwant Desai of the Indian National Congress.

As a legislator, Lodha played a role in the introduction of the Right to Information Act (RTI) in the Maharashtra Vidhan Sabha. He helped set up the Animal Welfare Board in Maharashtra and has proposed a law against cow slaughter in the state.

In 2014, he proposed the building of a coastal freeway from Nariman Point to Virar and from Nariman Point to Ghatkopar through Eastern Freeway.

References

External links 
 Mangal Prabhat Lodha Official Website

1955 births
Living people
People from Jodhpur
20th-century Indian lawyers
Politicians from Mumbai
Maharashtra MLAs 1995–1999
Maharashtra MLAs 1999–2004
Maharashtra MLAs 2004–2009
Maharashtra MLAs 2009–2014
Maharashtra MLAs 2014–2019
Bharatiya Janata Party politicians from Maharashtra